Established in 2001 as the first Singapore International School in Thailand, the Singapore International School of Bangkok (SISB; ,) launched SISB Ekkamai as its first campus and opened the Pracha Uthit campus in 2012, followed by the Suvarnabhumi campus in 2013 at Bangplee, Samutprakarn, Chiangmai and Thonburi campus in 2017. SISB has five campuses in Thailand, which adopt the Singapore and UK curricula as the foundation for teaching and learning. Currently, SISB is the only International School with 5 Campuses.

Accreditations 

In 2016, SISB Pracha Uthit was appointed by the Singapore Examinations and Assessment Board (SEAB) as the official examination centre for the Singapore International Primary School Examination (iPSLE). SISB Pracha Uthit is an approved centre certified by Cambridge International Examinations(CIE) to conduct the IGCSE, AS and A Levels examinations. SISB Pracha Uthit is a certified Hanban (Chinese proficiency) test centre. It is fully accredited by the Council of International Schools (CIS) and the New England Association of Schools & Colleges (NEASC). SISB was accepted as a member of the Thailand International Schools Activity Conference (TISAC) in June 2017.

 Cambridge Checkpoint tests in Primary 6 and Year 9 
 Singapore iPSLE in Primary 6 
 Cambridge IGCSE in Year 11 
 Cambridge AS / A Levels – Year 12 & 13 (Sixth Form)

Alumni
Jennis Oprasert, BNK48 Member

References

External links
Singapore International School of Bangkok (SISB)

International schools in Bangkok
Singaporean international schools in Thailand
Private schools in Thailand
Educational institutions established in 2001
2001 establishments in Thailand